Joe Kiser may refer to:

Joe L. Kiser, politician
Joe Kiser (musician)